What Does Brigitte Want? is a 1941 German comedy film directed by Paul Martin and starring Leny Marenbach, Albert Matterstock and Fita Benkhoff.

The film's sets were designed by the art director Robert A. Dietrich. It was shot at the Bavaria Studios in Munich with location filming taking place near to Prague.

Cast

References

Bibliography 
 Hans-Michael Bock and Tim Bergfelder. The Concise Cinegraph: An Encyclopedia of German Cinema. Berghahn Books, 2009.
 Rentschler, Eric. The Ministry of Illusion: Nazi Cinema and Its Afterlife. Harvard University Press, 1996.

External links 
 

1941 films
Films of Nazi Germany
German comedy films
1941 comedy films
1940s German-language films
Films directed by Paul Martin
Bavaria Film films
Films shot at Bavaria Studios
German black-and-white films
1940s German films